In mathematics, the Fibonorial , also called the Fibonacci factorial, where  is a nonnegative integer, is defined as the product of the first  positive Fibonacci numbers, i.e.

 

where  is the th Fibonacci number, and  gives the empty product (defined as the multiplicative identity, i.e. 1).

The Fibonorial  is defined analogously to the factorial . The Fibonorial numbers are used in the definition of Fibonomial coefficients (or Fibonacci-binomial coefficients) similarly as the factorial numbers are used in the definition of binomial coefficients.

Asymptotic behaviour 

The series of fibonorials is asymptotic to a function of the golden ratio : . 

Almost-Fibonorial numbers 

Almost-Fibonorial numbers: .

Almost-Fibonorial primes: prime numbers among the almost-Fibonorial numbers.

Quasi-Fibonorial numbers 

Quasi-Fibonorial numbers: .

Quasi-Fibonorial primes: prime numbers among the quasi-Fibonorial numbers.

Connection with the q-Factorial 

The fibonorial can be expressed in terms of the q-factorial and the golden ratio :

Sequences 

 Product of first  nonzero Fibonacci numbers .

References 

 

Fibonacci numbers

fr:Analogues de la factorielle#Factorielle de Fibonacci